Lilibeth Cuenca Rasmussen (born 1970 in Manila, Philippines), is a Danish video and performance artist.

Biography
Lilibeth Cuenca Rasmussen grow up in Manila and, from the age of eight, in Stevns, Denmark. She studied at the Royal Danish Academy of Fine Arts from 1996-2002 and has been guest lecturer at the Royal Danish Academy of Fine Arts and at Det Fynske Kunstakademi (the Art Academy of Funen) in  Odense in Denmark.

Work 
In her art, Rasmussen is primarily exploring socio-cultural relationships, often with her dual Danish and Filipino cultural backgrounds as the vantage point. Her first solo exhibition, Family show, was held in 2000 at the Akershus Kunstsenter at Lillestrøm in Norway. Her video piece Absolute Exotic was included in the 2007 traveling exhibition Global Feminisms, organized by the Elizabeth A. Sackler Center for Feminist Art at the Brooklyn Museum. In 2008 she was awarded the Eckersberg Medal.  She participated in the 2011 Venice Biennale in the Danish pavilion with Afghan Hound: four songs on video plus a live performance. 

In 2018, Rasmussen participated in Art Basel Hong Kong. Also in 2018, Rasmussen created Tow with the Flow after being commissioned by ART 2030 to create a performance with the subject of sustainable consumption. In 2019, Tow with the Flow was included in the Art Palm Beach in Florida.

In 2022 through early 2023, the Helsinki Art Museum exhibited Rasmussen's I am Not What You See.

Lilibeth Cuenca Rasmussen lives in Copenhagen.

Bibliography
Lilibeth Cuenca Rasmussen, Revolver Publishing by VVV, Berlin 2010,

Awards
2008 Eckersberg Medal

References

External links

Lilibeth Cuenca Rasmussen reenacting Shigeko Kobuta's 1965 performance Vagina Painting at the Renwick Gallery in New York, 2008 
Lilibeth Cuenca Rasmussen lecturing at the Brooklyn Museum in New York, March 2007

1970 births
Living people
20th-century Danish women artists
20th-century Danish artists
21st-century Danish women artists
Danish performance artists
Women performance artists
Recipients of the Eckersberg Medal
Danish contemporary artists
Royal Danish Academy of Fine Arts alumni 
People from Manila